Japanization, Japanisation or Japanification is the process by which Japanese culture dominates, assimilates, or influences other cultures. According to The American Heritage Dictionary of the English Language, "To japanize" means "To make or become Japanese in form, idiom, style, or character".

"Japanization" is also an economic term used to describe a situation when a country's economy falls into a sustained period of stagnant growth and price deflation, in reference to the problems that have plagued Japan's economy since the early 1990s.

Imperial period 

During the pre-imperial (pre-1868) period, a peaceful diplomacy was practiced, during which Japan did not expand much in territories beyond its own islands.

In the context of World War II, Japanization has a negative meaning because of military conquests and forced introduction of Japanese culture in conquered areas.

Okinawa 
After the Meiji Restoration in 1868, Japan began to follow the way of western imperialism and expansionism. In 1879, Japan officially annexed the Ryūkyū Kingdom, which was a tributary kingdom of both the Qing Dynasty and the Empire of Japan.

Though the Ryukyuan languages belong to the Japonic language family, the Japanese language is not intelligible to monolingual speakers of the Ryukyuan languages. The Japanese government regarded the Ryukyuan languages as dialects, and began to promote a language "standardization" program. In schools, "standard" Japanese was promoted, and portraits of the Japanese Emperor and Empress were introduced. Many high-ranking Japanese military officers went to inspect Okinawan schools to ensure that the Japanization was functioning well in the education system. This measure did not meet expectations in the beginning, partly because many local children's share of their heavy family labor impeded their presence in schools, and partly because people of the old Okinawan leading class received a more Chinese-style education and were not interested in learning "standard" Japanese. To promote assimilation, the Japanese government also discouraged some local customs.

Initially the local people resisted these assimilation measures. But after China was defeated in the First Sino-Japanese War in 1895, people lost confidence in China, and the resistance to Japanization became weaker, though it did not disappear. Men and women began to adopt more Japanese-styled names.

Taiwan 

Taiwan was ceded to the Empire of Japan in 1895 as a result of the First Sino-Japanese War. At the start, Taiwan was governed rather like a colony. In 1936, after the arrival of the 17th governor-general, Seizō Kobayashi, there was a change in the Japanese governance in Taiwan.

Kobayashi was the first non-civilian governor-general since 1919.

"Kōminka" literally means "to make people subjects of the emperor". The program had three components. First, the  promoted the Japanese language by teaching Japanese instead of Taiwanese Hokkien in the schools and by banning the use of Taiwanese Hokkien in the press. Second, the  replaced Taiwanese's Chinese names with Japanese names. Finally, the  drafted Taiwanese subjects into the Imperial Japanese Army and encouraged them to die in the service of the emperor.

Korea 

In Korea, during the Second World War, the use of written Korean in education and publications was banned by the Empire of Japan. The use of the Korean language was banned in schools after 1937 as part of the naisen-ittai program, along with the teaching of Japanese language and culture in schools instead of Korean culture and history. During this period, Koreans were forced to change their family name to a Japanese one.

Modern period
In the modern day, many countries and regions in East Asia, particularly South Korea and Taiwan, have absorbed and incorporated Japanese popular culture such as music and video for many years after Japanese growth during the 1980s and 1990s. Many Japanese films, especially soap operas, are popular in Taiwan, South Korea and China among the younger generations after the movies are translated into their local languages. Japanese electronic products and food are found throughout East Asia.

References

See also 
Japanification
Cultural genocide
Otaku

Cultural assimilation
Japanese culture